Jamie Dunlop (born 5 January 1966) is a former Australian rules footballer who played with Carlton in the Australian Football League (AFL).

Notes

External links 

Jamie Dunlop's profile at Blueseum

1966 births
Carlton Football Club players
Living people
Australian rules footballers from Victoria (Australia)